I Hear Voices may refer to:

I Hear Voices, a 1958 novel by Paul Ableman
"I Hear Voices", a song by Kasabian on their 2011 album Velociraptor!
"I Hear Voices Pt. 1", a song by MF Doom on their 2001 remastered album Operation: Doomsday
"I Hear Voices", a song by Psychic TV on their 1987 live album Live in Heaven
"I Hear Voices", a song by Puff Daddy on their 1999 album Forever
"I Hear Voices", a song by Robert Calvert on their 1986 album Test-Tube Conceived
"I Hear Voices", a song by Statik Selektah and KXNG Crooked on their 2016 album Statik KXNG
"I Hear Voices", a song by The Hassles on their 1967 album The Hassles
"I Hear Voices", a song by Uriah Heep on their 1998 album Sonic Origami
"I Hear Voices", a song by Waltari on their 2009 album Below Zero

See also
"Voices", a song by Split Enz on their 1984 album See Ya 'Round